Chetone angulosa is a moth of the family Erebidae. It was described by Francis Walker in 1854. It is found in Central America and northern South America, including Venezuela, Guatemala, Belize, Panama and Costa Rica.

References

Chetone
Moths described in 1854
Arctiinae of South America